In geometry, a pedal triangle is obtained by projecting a  point onto the sides of a triangle.

More specifically, consider a triangle ABC, and a point P that is not one of the vertices A, B, C. Drop perpendiculars from P to the three sides of the triangle (these may need to be produced, i.e., extended).  Label L, M, N the intersections of the lines from P with the sides BC, AC, AB. The pedal triangle is then LMN.

If ABC is not an obtuse triangle, P is the orthocenter then the angles of LMN are 180°−2A, 180°−2B and 180°−2C.

The location of the chosen point P relative to the chosen triangle ABC gives rise to some special cases:

 If P = orthocenter, then LMN = orthic triangle.
 If P = incenter, then LMN = intouch triangle.
 If P = circumcenter, then LMN = medial triangle.

If P is on the circumcircle of the triangle, LMN collapses to a line. This is then called the pedal line, or sometimes the Simson line after Robert Simson.

The vertices of the pedal triangle of an interior point P, as shown in the top diagram, divide the sides of the original triangle in such a way as to satisfy Carnot's theorem:

Trilinear coordinates
If P has trilinear coordinates p : q : r, then the vertices L,M,N of the pedal triangle of P are given by
L = 0 : q + p cos C : r + p cos B
M = p + q cos C : 0 : r + q cos A
N = p + r cos B : q + r cos A : 0

Antipedal triangle

One vertex, L, of the antipedal triangle''' of P is the point of intersection of the perpendicular to BP through B and the perpendicular to CP through C. Its other vertices, M ' and N ', are constructed analogously.  Trilinear coordinates are given byL = − (q + p cos C)(r + p cos B) : (r + p cos B)(p + q cos C) : (q + p cos C)(p + r cos B)
M''' = (r + q cos A)(q + p cos C) : − (r + q cos A)(p + q cos C) : (p + q cos C)(q + r cos A)N = (q + r cos A)(r + p cos B) : (p + r cos B)(r + q cos A) : − (p + r cos B)(q + r cos A)

For example, the excentral triangle is the antipedal triangle of the incenter.

Suppose that P does not lie on any of the extended sides BC, CA, AB, and let P−1 denote the isogonal conjugate of P.  The pedal triangle of P is homothetic to the antipedal triangle of P−1.  The homothetic center (which is a triangle center if and only if P is a triangle center) is the point given in trilinear coordinates by

 ap(p + q cos C)(p + r cos B) : bq(q + r cos A)(q + p cos C) : cr(r + p cos B)(r + q cos A).

The product of the areas of the pedal triangle of P and the antipedal triangle of P−1 equals the square of the area of triangle ABC.

Pedal circle 

The pedal circle is defined as the circumcircle of the pedal triangle. Note that the pedal circle is not defined for points lying on the circumcircle of the triangle.

Pedal circle of isogonal conjugates 
For any point  not lying on the circumcircle of the triangle, it is known that  and its isogonal conjugate  have a common pedal circle, whose center is the midpoint of these two points.

References

External links 
 Mathworld: Pedal Triangle 
 Simson Line
 Pedal Triangle and Isogonal Conjugacy

Objects defined for a triangle